The Seminole Casino Immokalee is a Class III tribal gaming casino and hotel in the town of Immokalee, Florida, United States, 35 miles from Naples. The Seminole Casino is owned and operated by the Seminole Tribe of Florida. Originally opened in February 1994, and recently expanded the property in February 2009; the Seminole Casino offers Vegas Style Slot machines.

The hotel opened in 2015. It has 99 rooms.

See also
List of casinos in Florida
Seminole Hard Rock Hotel and Casino Hollywood
Seminole Hard Rock Hotel and Casino Tampa

External links
Seminole Casino Immokalee

References 

Casinos completed in 1994
Native American casinos
Tourist attractions in Collier County, Florida
Casinos in Florida
Buildings and structures in Collier County, Florida
Seminole Tribe of Florida
1994 establishments in Florida
Native American history of Florida